The Department of Transport is the department of the South African government concerned with transport. The political head of the department is the Minister of Transport, currently Fikile Mbalula; his deputy is Sindisiwe Chikunga.

Responsibility for transport is constitutionally between the national transport department and the nine provincial transport departments. The national department has exclusive responsibility for national and international airports, national roads, railways and marine transport; the national and provincial departments share responsibility for other airports, public transport, road traffic regulation and vehicle licensing; and the provincial departments have exclusive responsibility for provincial and local roads, traffic and parking.

In the 2011 national budget, the department received an appropriation of 35,084 million rand. As of 30 September 2010 it had 529 employees.

Structure
The Department of Transport is divided into six branches:
 Administration
 Integrated Transport Planning
 Rail Transport
 Civil Aviation
 Maritime Transport
 Public Transport

The department is also responsible for several semi-independent agencies and state-owned companies:
 Passenger Rail Agency of South Africa
 South African National Roads Agency
 Road Traffic Management Corporation
 South African Maritime Safety Authority
 South African Civil Aviation Authority
 Cross Border Road Transport Agency
 Road Accident Fund
 Railway Safety Regulator
 Ports Regulator
 Air Traffic and Navigation Services Company
 Airports Company of South Africa
 Road Traffic Infringement Agency

See also

Provincial transport departments:
 Eastern Cape Department of Transport
 Free State Department of Police, Roads and Transport
 Gauteng Department of Roads and Transport
 KwaZulu-Natal Department of Transport
 Limpopo Department of Roads and Transport
 Mpumalanga Department of Public Works, Roads and Transport
 Northern Cape Department of Transport, Safety and Liaison
 North West Department of Public Works, Roads and Transport
 Western Cape Department of Transport and Public Works

References

External links
 Official website

Transport
Transport organisations based in South Africa
South Africa